Bistramide A is a chemical compound originally found in the marine ascidian Lissoclinum bistratum, in the genus Lissoclinum. It has been identified as a toxin.

References 

Spiro compounds
Carboxamides
Tetrahydropyrans